Villafranca in Lunigiana is a comune (municipality) in the Province of Massa and Carrara in the Italian region Tuscany, located about  northwest of Florence and about  northwest of Massa.

It is located on the Via Francigena, and has maintained part of the medieval historical center. In the frazione of Mocrone is the small church of San Maurizio, from the 13th-14th centuries.

References

Cities and towns in Tuscany